Charles Dorgan (1922 - 28 August 2001) was an Irish hurler. At club level he played with Little Island and Sarsfields and was also a member of the Cork senior hurling team.

Career

Born in Little Island, Dorgan first enjoyed hurling success with the Little Island team that won the East Cork Junior B Championship title. He subsequently spent a number of years with the Sarsfields club before winning an East Cork Junior A Championship title with Leeside in 1949. At inter-county level, Dorgan was sub-goalkeeper to Tom Mulcahy on the Cork senior hurling team that won a record fourth successive All-Ireland Championship title in 1944.

Honours

Little Island
East Cork Junior B Hurling Championship: 1940

Leeside
East Cork Junior A Hurling Championship: 1949

Cork
All-Ireland Senior Hurling Championship: 1944
Munster Senior Hurling Championship: 1944

References

1922 births
2001 deaths
Sarsfields (Cork) hurlers
Cork inter-county hurlers